Kacen Callender is a Saint Thomian author of children's fiction and fantasy, best known for their Stonewall Book Award and Lambda Literary Award-winning middle grade debut Hurricane Child. Their fantasy novel, Queen of the Conquered, is the 2020 winner of the World Fantasy Award and King and the Dragonflies won the 2020 National Book Award for Young People's Literature and the 2021 Lambda Literary Award for LGBTQ Children's/Middle Grade.

Personal life 
Callender was born (in 1989) and raised in Saint Thomas, U.S. Virgin Islands. Callender also has a bachelor's degree from Sarah Lawrence College in Japanese and Creative Writing and a MFA from The New School's Writing for Children program.

Prior to becoming an author, Callender was an editor at Little, Brown. In 2018, in reaction to Hurricane Irma, Callender launched the online auction #USVIPubFund, under which they and other book publishing professionals raised $104,000 to support the U.S. Virgin Islands.

Callender is Black, queer, trans, and uses they/them and he/him pronouns. Callender debuted their new name when announcing their next young adult novel Felix Ever After in May 2019.

They currently live in St. Thomas of the US Virgin Islands.

Critical reception 
Their debut novel, Hurricane Child, about a twelve-year-old born during a hurricane who believes herself to be cursed, was published by Scholastic in 2018 and received the Stonewall Book Award in 2019.

Both Hurricane Child and Callender's young adult debut, This is Kind of an Epic Love Story, were nominated for a 2019 Lambda Literary Award in the category LGBTQ* Children's/Young Adult. Hurricane Child went on to win the award.

Their second young adult novel, Felix Ever After, is about a transgender teen who catfishes a classmate for revenge and ends up falling for him. Felix Ever After was published with Balzer + Bray in 2020 and sold together with This is Kind of an Epic Love Story in November 2017.

King and the Dragonflies, Callender's second middle-grade novel that explores race and sexuality, was published in 2020. It received a starred review from School Library Journal, Horn Book, and Publishers Weekly.

Their adult debut, Queen of the Conquered, was published by Orbit in 2019. It's set in a Caribbean-inspired world and tells the story of a black protagonist fighting back against colonizers. It received starred reviews from Kirkus Reviews and School Library Journal.

King and the Dragonflies was named the winner of the Lambda Literary Award for Children's/Middle Grade Literature at the 33rd Lambda Literary Awards in 2021.

Bibliography

Middle Grade

Young Adult

Adult Fantasy 

 Islands of Blood and Storm Series

Audio Novella

Awards

References

External links

Living people
Writers from Philadelphia
Sarah Lawrence College alumni
The New School alumni
United States Virgin Islands writers
Non-binary novelists
Lambda Literary Award for Children's and Young Adult Literature winners
Stonewall Book Award winners
Writers of young adult literature
American fantasy writers
American young adult novelists
1989 births
American non-binary writers